The Woman from Moscow is a 1928 American drama film starring Pola Negri. This was Negri's last silent film released with musical score and sound effects.

The picture is a remake of Paramount's 1918 Pauline Frederick film Fedora, based on the play by Victorien Sardou.

Cast
Pola Negri as Princess Fedora
Norman Kerry as Loris Ipanoff
Lawrence Grant as The General Stroganoff
Paul Lukas as Vladimir, his son
Otto Matieson as Gretch Milner
Maude George as Olga Andreavitshka
Bodil Rosing as Nadia
Jack Luden as Ipanoff's Brother
Martha Franklin as Ipanoff's Mother
Mirra Rayo as Ipanoff's Sister 
Tetsu Komai as Groom

Preservation status
Reels 4, 6, and 7 exist at Lobster Films.

References

External links

allmovie/synopsis;The Woman from Moscow
 lobby card of Pola in the film

1928 films
Paramount Pictures films
American romantic drama films
American films based on plays
Films based on works by Victorien Sardou
American black-and-white films
American silent feature films
Films scored by Karl Hajos
Films directed by Ludwig Berger
1920s American films
Silent romantic drama films
Silent American drama films